Dietrich (Theodoric) Schenk von Erbach (died 6 May 1459) was a German nobleman.  He was Archbishop of Mainz from 1434 until 1459. 

Theodoric was a son of Arch-Cupbearer Eberhard VI of Erbach. He was a member of the cathedral chapter of Mainz when on 6 July 1434 he was elected its archbishop. Theodoric was confirmed by Pope Eugene IV on 20 October. At the Council of Basel Theodoric maintained a neutral position and tried to mediate between both sides. In 1439 he managed to get all the German princes and the King to recognise Eugene as the legal pope.

He commissioned the printing of the Mainz Psalter.

Theodoric died in Aschaffenburg in 1459.

References

1459 deaths
Archbishop-Electors of Mainz
15th-century Roman Catholic archbishops in the Holy Roman Empire
House of Erbach
Year of birth unknown